The United States Department of Homeland Security (DHS) is the U.S. federal executive department responsible for public security, roughly comparable to the interior or home ministries of other countries. Its stated missions involve anti-terrorism, border security, immigration and customs, cyber security, and disaster prevention and management.

It began operations in 2003, formed as a result of the Homeland Security Act of 2002, enacted in response to the September 11 attacks. With more than 240,000 employees, DHS is the third-largest Cabinet department, after the Departments of Defense and Veterans Affairs. Homeland security policy is coordinated at the White House by the Homeland Security Council. Other agencies with significant homeland security responsibilities include the Departments of Health and Human Services, Justice, and Energy.

History

Creation

In response to the September 11 attacks, President George W. Bush announced the establishment of the Office of Homeland Security (OHS) to coordinate "homeland security" efforts. The office was headed by former Pennsylvania Governor Tom Ridge, who assumed the title of Assistant to the President for Homeland Security. The official announcement states:

Ridge began his duties as OHS director on October 8, 2001. On November 25, 2002, the Homeland Security Act established the Department of Homeland Security to consolidate U.S. executive branch organizations related to "homeland security" into a single Cabinet agency. The Gilmore Commission, supported by much of Congress and John Bolton, helped further solidify need for the department. The DHS incorporated the following 22 agencies.

List of incorporated agencies

According to political scientist Peter Andreas, the creation of DHS constituted the most significant government reorganization since the Cold War and the most substantial reorganization of federal agencies since the National Security Act of 1947 (which had placed the different military departments under a secretary of defense and created the National Security Council and Central Intelligence Agency). DHS constitutes the most diverse merger of federal functions and responsibilities, incorporating 22 government agencies into a single organization. The founding of the DHS marked a change in American thought towards threats.
Introducing the term "homeland" centers attention on a population that needs to be protected not only against emergencies such as natural disasters but also against diffuse threats from individuals who are non-native to the United States.

Prior to the signing of the bill, controversy about its adoption was focused on whether the Federal Bureau of Investigation and the Central Intelligence Agency should be incorporated in part or in whole (neither were included). The bill was also controversial for the presence of unrelated "riders", as well as for eliminating certain union-friendly civil service and labor protections for department employees. Without these protections, employees could be expeditiously reassigned or dismissed on grounds of security, incompetence or insubordination, and DHS would not be required to notify their union representatives. The plan stripped 180,000 government employees of their union rights. In 2002, Bush officials argued that the September 11 attacks made the proposed elimination of employee protections imperative.

Congress ultimately passed the Homeland Security Act of 2002, and President Bush signed the bill into law on November 25, 2002. It was the largest U.S. government reorganization in the 50 years since the United States Department of Defense was created.

Tom Ridge was named secretary on January 24, 2003, and began naming his chief deputies. DHS officially began operations on January 24, 2003, but most of the department's component agencies were not transferred into the new department until March 1.

After establishing the basic structure of DHS and working to integrate its components, Ridge announced his resignation on November 30, 2004, following the re-election of President Bush. Bush initially nominated former New York City Police Department commissioner Bernard Kerik as his successor, but on December 10, Kerik withdrew his nomination, citing personal reasons and saying it "would not be in the best interests" of the country for him to pursue the post.

Changes under Secretary Chertoff 
On January 11, 2005, President Bush nominated federal judge Michael Chertoff to succeed Ridge. Chertoff was confirmed on February 15, 2005, by a vote of 98–0 in the U.S. Senate and was sworn in the same day.

In February 2005, DHS and the Office of Personnel Management issued rules relating to employee pay and discipline for a new personnel system named MaxHR. The Washington Post said that the rules would allow DHS "to override any provision in a union contract by issuing a department-wide directive" and would make it "difficult, if not impossible, for unions to negotiate over arrangements for staffing, deployments, technology and other workplace matters". In August 2005, U.S. District Judge Rosemary M. Collyer blocked the plan on the grounds that it did not ensure collective-bargaining rights for DHS employees. A federal appeals court ruled against DHS in 2006; pending a final resolution to the litigation, Congress's fiscal year 2008 appropriations bill for DHS provided no funding for the proposed new personnel system.
DHS announced in early 2007 that it was retooling its pay and performance system and retiring the name "MaxHR". In a February 2008 court filing, DHS said that it would no longer pursue the new rules, and that it would abide by the existing civil service labor-management procedures. A federal court issued an order closing the case.

Trump administration
On November 16, 2018, President Donald Trump signed the Cybersecurity and Infrastructure Security Agency Act of 2018 into law, which elevated the mission of the former DHS National Protection and Programs Directorate and established the Cybersecurity and Infrastructure Security Agency. In fiscal year 2018, DHS was allocated a net discretionary budget of $47.716 billion.

Biden administration 
In 2021, the Department of Justice began carrying out an investigation into white supremacy and extremism in the DHS ranks.

DHS also halted large-scale immigration raids at job sites, saying in October 2021 that the administration was planning "a new enforcement strategy to more effectively target employers who pay substandard wages and engage in exploitative labor practices."

Function

Whereas the Department of Defense is charged with military actions abroad, the Department of Homeland Security works in the civilian sphere to protect the United States within, at, and outside its borders. Its stated goal is to prepare for, prevent, and respond to domestic emergencies, particularly terrorism. On March 1, 2003, DHS absorbed the U.S. Customs Service and Immigration and Naturalization Service (INS) and assumed its duties. In doing so, it divided the enforcement and services functions into two separate and new agencies: Immigration and Customs Enforcement and Citizenship and Immigration Services. The investigative divisions and intelligence gathering units of the INS and Customs Service were merged forming Homeland Security Investigations, the primary investigative arm of DHS. Additionally, the border enforcement functions of the INS, including the U.S. Border Patrol, the U.S. Customs Service, and the Animal and Plant Health Inspection Service were consolidated into a new agency under DHS: U.S. Customs and Border Protection. The Federal Protective Service falls under the National Protection and Programs Directorate.

Structure

The Department of Homeland Security is headed by the Secretary of Homeland Security with the assistance of the Deputy Secretary. The department contains the components listed below.

List of subordinate agencies

Agencies
United States Citizenship and Immigration Services: Processes and examines citizenship, residency, and asylum requests from aliens.
U.S. Customs and Border Protection: Law enforcement agency that enforces U.S. laws along its international borders (air, land, and sea) including its enforcement of U.S. immigration, customs, and agriculture laws while at and patrolling between all U.S. ports-of-entry.
U.S. Immigration and Customs Enforcement: Law enforcement agency divided into two bureaus:
 Homeland Security Investigations (HSI) investigates violations of more than 400 U.S. laws and gathers intelligence on national and international criminal activities that threaten the security of the homeland (Homeland Security Investigations); and
 Enforcement and Removal Operations (ERO) enforces administrative violations of the Immigration and Nationality Act by detaining, deporting, and removing violators of United States immigration law.
Transportation Security Administration: Responsible for aviation security (domestic and international, most notably conducting passenger screenings at airports), as well as land and water transportation security
United States Coast Guard: Military service responsible for law enforcement, maritime security, national defense, maritime mobility, and protection of natural resources.
United States Secret Service: Law enforcement agency tasked with two distinct and critical national security missions: 
 Investigative Mission – The investigative mission of the USSS is to safeguard the payment and financial systems of the United States from a wide range of financial and electronic-based crimes. 
 Protective Mission – The protective mission of the USSS is to ensure the safety of the President of the United States, the Vice President of the United States, their immediate families, and foreign heads of state.
Federal Emergency Management Agency: agency that oversees the federal government's response to natural disasters like earthquakes, hurricanes, tornadoes, floods, forest fires.

Passports for U.S. citizens are issued by the U.S. Department of State, not the Department of Homeland Security.

Advisory groups:
 Homeland Security Advisory Council: State and local government, first responders, private sector, and academics
 National Infrastructure Advisory Council: Advises on security of public and private information systems
  Homeland Security Science and Technology Advisory Committee: Advise the Under Secretary for Science and Technology.
  Critical Infrastructure Partnership Advisory Council: Coordinate infrastructure protection with private sector and other levels of government
 Interagency Coordinating Council on Emergency Preparedness and Individuals with Disabilities
 Task Force on New Americans: "An inter-agency effort to help immigrants learn English, embrace the common core of American civic culture, and become fully American."

Other components:
 Countering Weapons of Mass Destruction Office: Counter attempts by terrorists or other threat actors to carry out an attack against the United States or its interests using a weapon of mass destruction. Secretary Kirstjen Nielsen established the CWMD Office in December 2017 by consolidating primarily the Domestic Nuclear Detection Office and a majority of the Office of Health Affairs, as well as other DHS elements.
 Federal Law Enforcement Training Center: Interagency law enforcement training facilities located in Georgia, New Mexico, and South Carolina.
 National Protection and Programs Directorate: risk-reduction, encompassing both physical and virtual threats and their associated human elements.
 Federal Protective Service: Federal law enforcement and security agency that protects and investigates crimes against U.S. federal buildings, properties, assets, and federal government interests.
 National Communications System
 Directorate for Science and Technology: Research and development
 Directorate for Management: Responsible for internal budgets, accounting, performance monitoring, and human resources
 Office of Strategy, Policy, and Plans: Long-range policy planning and coordination
 Office of Immigration Statistics
 Office of Intelligence and Analysis: Identify and assess threats based on intelligence from various agencies
 Office of Operations Coordination: Monitor domestic security situation on a daily basis, coordinate activities with state and local authorities and private sector infrastructure
 Office of the Secretary includes the Privacy Office, Office for Civil Rights and Civil Liberties, Office of Inspector General, Citizenship and Immigration Services Ombudsman, Office of Legislative Affairs, Office of the General Counsel, Office of Public Affairs, Office of Counternarcotics Enforcement (CNE), Office of the Executive Secretariat (ESEC), and the Military Advisor's Office.
 Cybersecurity and Infrastructure Security Agency

In an August 5, 2002, speech, President Bush said: "We are fighting ... to secure freedom in the homeland." Prior to the creation of DHS, U.S. Presidents had referred to the U.S. as "the nation" or "the republic" and to its internal policies as "domestic". Also unprecedented was the use, from 2002, of the phrase "the homeland" by White House spokespeople.

National Terrorism Advisory System
In 2011, the Department of Homeland Security phased out the old Homeland Security Advisory System, replacing it with a two-level National Terrorism Advisory System. The system has two types of advisories: alerts and bulletins. NTAS bulletins permit the secretary to communicate critical terrorism information that, while not necessarily indicative of a specific threat against the United States, can reach homeland security partners or the public quickly, thereby allowing recipients to implement necessary protective measures. Alerts are issued when there is specific and credible information of a terrorist threat against the United States. Alerts have two levels: elevated and imminent. An elevated alert is issued when there is credible information about an attack but only general information about timing or a target. An Imminent Alert is issued when the threat is very specific and impending in the very near term.

On March 12, 2002, the Homeland Security Advisory System, a color-coded terrorism risk advisory scale, was created as the result of a Presidential Directive to provide a "comprehensive and effective means to disseminate information regarding the risk of terrorist acts to Federal, State, and local authorities and to the American people". Many procedures at government facilities are tied into the alert level; for example a facility may search all entering vehicles when the alert is above a certain level. Since January 2003, it has been administered in coordination with DHS; it has also been the target of frequent jokes and ridicule on the part of the administration's detractors about its ineffectiveness. After resigning, Tom Ridge said he did not always agree with the threat level adjustments pushed by other government agencies.

In January 2003, the office was merged into the Department of Homeland Security and the White House Homeland Security Council, both of which were created by the Homeland Security Act of 2002. The Homeland Security Council, similar in nature to the National Security Council, retains a policy coordination and advisory role and is led by the Assistant to the President for Homeland Security.

Seal

The seal was developed with input from senior DHS leadership, employees, and the U.S. Commission on Fine Arts. The Ad Council – which partners with DHS on its Ready.gov campaign – and the consulting company Landor Associates were responsible for graphic design and maintaining heraldic integrity.

- DHS June 6, 2003

Headquarters

Since its inception, the department has had its temporary headquarters in Washington, D.C.'s Nebraska Avenue Complex, a former naval facility. The  site, across from American University, has 32 buildings comprising  of administrative space. In early 2007, the department submitted a $4.1 billion plan to Congress to consolidate its 60-plus Washington-area offices into a single headquarters complex at the St. Elizabeths Hospital campus in Anacostia, Southeast Washington, D.C.

The move was championed by District of Columbia officials because of the positive economic impact it would have on historically depressed Anacostia. The move was criticized by historic preservationists, who claimed the revitalization plans would destroy dozens of historic buildings on the campus. Community activists criticized the plans because the facility would remain walled off and have little interaction with the surrounding area.

In February 2015 the General Services Administration said that the site would open in 2021. DHS headquarters staff began moving to St. Elizabeths in April 2019 after the completion of the Center Building renovation.

Disaster preparedness and response

Congressional budgeting effects 
During a Senate Homeland Security and Governmental Affairs Committee hearing on the reauthorization of DHS, Deputy Secretary Elaine Duke said there is a weariness and anxiety within DHS about the repeated congressional efforts to agree to a long-term spending plan, which had resulted in several threats to shut down the federal government. "Shutdowns are disruptive", Duke said. She said the "repeated failure on a longtime spending plan resulting in short-term continuing resolutions (CRs) has caused "angst" among the department's 240,000 employees in the weeks leading up to the CRs." The uncertainty about funding hampers DHS's ability to pursue major projects and it takes away attention and manpower from important priorities. Seventy percent of DHS employees are considered essential and are not furloughed during government shutdowns.

Ready.gov

Soon after formation, the department worked with the Ad Council to launch the Ready Campaign, a national public service advertising (PSA) campaign to educate and empower Americans to prepare for and respond to emergencies including natural and man-made disasters. With pro bono creative support from the Martin Agency of Richmond, Virginia, the campaign website "Ready.gov" and materials were conceived in March 2002 and launched in February 2003, just before the launch of the Iraq War. One of the first announcements that garnered widespread public attention to this campaign was one by Tom Ridge in which he stated that in the case of a chemical attack, citizens should use duct tape and plastic sheeting to build a homemade bunker, or "sheltering in place" to protect themselves. As a result, the sales of duct tape skyrocketed, and DHS was criticized for being too alarmist.

On March 1, 2003, the Federal Emergency Management Agency was absorbed into the DHS and in the fall of 2008 took over coordination of the campaign. The Ready Campaign and its Spanish-language version Listo.gov asks individuals to build an emergency supply kit, make a family emergency plan and be informed about the different types of emergencies that can occur and how to respond. The campaign messages have been promoted through television, radio, print, outdoor and web PSAs, as well as brochures, toll-free phone lines and the English and Spanish language websites Ready.gov and Listo.gov.

The general campaign aims to reach all Americans, but targeted resources are also available via "Ready Business" for small- to medium-sized business  and "Ready Kids" for parents and teachers of children ages 8–12. In 2015, the campaign also launched a series of PSAs to help the whole community, people with disabilities and others with access and functional needs prepare for emergencies, which included open captioning, a certified deaf interpreter and audio descriptions for viewers who are blind or have low vision.

National Incident Management System

On March 1, 2004, the National Incident Management System (NIMS) was created. The stated purpose was to provide a consistent incident management approach for federal, state, local, and tribal governments. Under Homeland Security Presidential Directive-5, all federal departments were required to adopt the NIMS and to use it in their individual domestic incident management and emergency prevention, preparedness, response, recovery, and mitigation program and activities.

National Response Framework

In December 2004, the National Response Plan (NRP) was created, in an attempt to align federal coordination structures, capabilities, and resources into a unified, all-discipline, and all-hazards approach to domestic incident management. The NRP was built on the template of the NIMS.

On January 22, 2008, the National Response Framework was published in the Federal Register as an updated replacement of the NRP, effective March 22, 2008.

Surge Capacity Force
The Post-Katrina Emergency Management Reform Act directs the DHS Secretary to designate employees from throughout the department to staff a Surge Capacity Force (SCF). During a declared disaster, the DHS Secretary will determine if SCF support is necessary. The secretary will then authorize FEMA to task and deploy designated personnel from DHS components and other Federal Executive Agencies to respond to extraordinary disasters.

Cyber-security

The DHS National Cyber Security Division (NCSD) is responsible for the response system, risk management program, and requirements for cyber-security in the U.S. The division is home to US-CERT operations and the National Cyber Alert System. The DHS Science and Technology Directorate helps government and private end-users transition to new cyber-security capabilities. This directorate also funds the Cyber Security Research and Development Center, which identifies and prioritizes research and development for NCSD. The center works on the Internet's routing infrastructure (the SPRI program) and Domain Name System (DNSSEC), identity theft and other online criminal activity (ITTC), Internet traffic and networks research (PREDICT datasets and the DETER testbed), Department of Defense and HSARPA exercises (Livewire and Determined Promise), and wireless security in cooperation with Canada.

On October 30, 2009, DHS opened the National Cybersecurity and Communications Integration Center. The center brings together government organizations responsible for protecting computer networks and networked infrastructure.

In January 2017, DHS officially designated state-run election systems as critical infrastructure. The designation made it easier for state and local election officials to get cybersecurity help from the federal government. In October 2017, DHS convened a Government Coordinating Council (GCC) for the Election Infrastructure Subsection with representatives from various state and federal agencies such as the Election Assistance Commission and National Association of Secretaries of State.

Criticism

Excess, waste, and ineffectiveness
The department has been dogged by persistent criticism over excessive bureaucracy, waste, ineffectiveness and lack of transparency. Congress estimates that the department has wasted roughly $15 billion in failed contracts. In 2003, the department came under fire after the media revealed that Laura Callahan, Deputy Chief Information Officer at DHS with responsibilities for sensitive national security databases, had obtained her bachelor, masters, and doctorate computer science degrees through Hamilton University, a diploma mill in a small town in Wyoming. The department was blamed for up to $2 billion of waste and fraud after audits by the Government Accountability Office revealed widespread misuse of government credit cards by DHS employees, with purchases including beer brewing kits, $70,000 of plastic dog booties that were later deemed unusable, boats purchased at double the retail price (many of which later could not be found), and iPods ostensibly for use in "data storage".

A 2015 inspection of IT infrastructure found that the department was running over a hundred computer systems whose owners were unknown, including Secret and Top Secret databases, many with out of date security or weak passwords. Basic security reviews were absent, and the department had apparently made deliberate attempts to delay publication of information about the flaws.

Data mining
On September 5, 2007, the Associated Press reported that the DHS had scrapped an anti-terrorism data mining tool called ADVISE (Analysis, Dissemination, Visualization, Insight and Semantic Enhancement) after the agency's internal inspector general found that pilot testing of the system had been performed using data on real people without required privacy safeguards in place. The system, in development at Lawrence Livermore and Pacific Northwest National Laboratory since 2003, has cost the agency $42 million to date. Controversy over the program is not new; in March 2007, the Government Accountability Office stated that "the ADVISE tool could misidentify or erroneously associate an individual with undesirable activity such as fraud, crime or terrorism." Homeland Security's Inspector General later said that ADVISE was poorly planned, time-consuming for analysts to use, and lacked adequate justifications.

Fusion centers

Fusion centers are terrorism prevention and response centers, many of which were created under a joint project between the Department of Homeland Security and the U.S. Department of Justice's Office of Justice Programs between 2003 and 2007. The fusion centers gather information from government sources as well as their partners in the private sector.

They are designed to promote information sharing at the federal level between agencies such as the CIA, FBI, Department of Justice, U.S. military and  state and local level government. , DHS recognized at least seventy-two fusion centers. Fusion centers may also be affiliated with an Emergency Operations Center that responds in the event of a disaster.

There are a number of documented criticisms of fusion centers, including relative ineffectiveness at counterterrorism activities, the potential to be used for secondary purposes unrelated to counterterrorism, and their links to violations of civil liberties of American citizens and others.

David Rittgers of the Cato Institute notes:

a long line of fusion center and DHS reports labeling broad swaths of the public as a threat to national security. The North Texas Fusion System labeled Muslim lobbyists as a potential threat; a DHS analyst in Wisconsin thought both pro- and anti-abortion activists were worrisome; a Pennsylvania homeland security contractor watched environmental activists, Tea Party groups, and a Second Amendment rally; the Maryland State Police put anti-death penalty and anti-war activists in a federal terrorism database; a fusion center in Missouri thought that all third-party voters and Ron Paul supporters were a threat ...

Mail interception
In 2006, MSNBC reported that Grant Goodman, "an 81-year-old retired University of Kansas history professor, received a letter from his friend in the Philippines that had been opened and resealed with a strip of dark green tape bearing the words "by Border Protection" and carrying the official Homeland Security seal." The letter was sent by a devout Catholic Filipino woman with no history of supporting Islamic terrorism. A spokesman for U.S. Customs and Border Protection "acknowledged that the agency can, will and does open mail coming to U.S. citizens that originates from a foreign country whenever it's deemed necessary":

All mail originating outside the United States Customs territory that is to be delivered inside the U.S. Customs territory is subject to Customs examination," says the CBP Web site. That includes personal correspondence.  "All mail means 'all mail,'" said John Mohan, a CBP spokesman, emphasizing the point.

The department declined to outline what criteria are used to determine when a piece of personal correspondence should be opened or to say how often or in what volume Customs might be opening mail.

Goodman's story provoked outrage in the blogosphere, as well as in the more established media. Reacting to the incident, Mother Jones remarked "unlike other prying government agencies, Homeland Security wants you to know it is watching you." CNN observed "on the heels of the NSA wiretapping controversy, Goodman's letter raises more concern over the balance between privacy and security."

Employee morale
In July 2006, the Office of Personnel Management conducted a survey of federal employees in all 36 federal agencies on job satisfaction and how they felt their respective agency was headed. DHS was last or near to last in every category including;
33rd on the talent management index
35th on the leadership and knowledge management index
36th on the job satisfaction index
36th on the results-oriented performance culture index

The low scores were attributed to concerns about basic supervision, management and leadership within the agency. Examples from the survey reveal most concerns are about promotion and pay increase based on merit, dealing with poor performance, rewarding creativity and innovation, leadership generating high levels of motivation in the workforce, recognition for doing a good job, lack of satisfaction with various component policies and procedures and lack of information about what is going on with the organization.

DHS is the only large federal agency to score below 50% in overall survey rankings. It was last of large federal agencies in 2014 with 44.0% and fell even lower in 2015 at 43.1%, again last place. DHS continued to rank at the bottom in 2019, prompting congressional inquiries into the problem. High work load resulting from chronic staff shortage, particularly in Customs and Border Protection, has contributed to low morale, as have scandals and intense negative public opinion heightened by immigration policies of the Obama administration.

DHS has struggled to retain women, who complain of overt and subtle misogyny.

MIAC report
In 2009, the Missouri Information Analysis Center (MIAC) made news for targeting supporters of third party candidates (such as Ron Paul), anti-abortion activists, and conspiracy theorists as potential militia members. Anti-war activists and Islamic lobby groups were targeted in Texas, drawing criticism from the American Civil Liberties Union.

According to DHS:

The Privacy Office has identified a number of risks to privacy presented by the fusion center program:
Justification for fusion centers
Ambiguous Lines of Authority, Rules, and Oversight
Participation of the Military and the Private Sector
Data Mining
Excessive Secrecy
Inaccurate or Incomplete Information
Mission Creep

Freedom of Information Act processing performance
In the Center for Effective Government analysis of 15 federal agencies which receive the most Freedom of Information Act (FOIA) requests, published in 2015 (using 2012 and 2013 data), the Department of Homeland Security earned a D+ by scoring 69 out of a possible 100 points, i.e. did not earn a satisfactory overall grade. It also had not updated its policies since the 2007 FOIA amendments.

Fourteen Words slogan and "88" reference
In 2018, the DHS was accused of referencing the white nationalist Fourteen Words slogan in an official document, by using a similar fourteen-worded title, in relation to unlawful immigration and border control:

We Must Secure The Border And Build The Wall To Make America Safe Again.

Although dismissed by the DHS as a coincidence, both the use of "88" in a document and the similarity to the slogan's phrasing ("We must secure the existence of our people and a future for white children"), drew criticism and controversy from several media outlets.

Calls for abolition 
While abolishing the DHS has been proposed since 2011, the idea was popularized when Alexandria Ocasio-Cortez suggested abolishing the DHS in light of the abuses against detained migrants by the Immigration and Customs Enforcement and Customs and Border Protection agencies.

In 2020, the DHS was criticized for detaining protesters in Portland, Oregon.  It even drew rebuke from the department's first secretary Tom Ridge who said, "It would be a cold day in hell before I would consent to an uninvited, unilateral intervention into one of my cities”.

On August 10, 2020, in an opinion article for USA Today by Anthony D. Romero, the ACLU called for the dismantling of DHS over the deployment of federal forces in July 2020 during the Portland protests.

ACLU Lawsuit 
In December 2020, ACLU filed a lawsuit against the DHS, U.S. CBP and U.S. ICE, seeking the release of their records of purchasing cellphone location data. ACLU alleges that this data was used to track U.S. citizens and immigrants and is seeking to discover the full extent of the alleged surveillance.

See also

Container Security Initiative
E-Verify
Electronic System for Travel Authorization
Emergency Management Institute
 History of homeland security in the United States
Homeland Security USA
Homeland security grant
Home Office, equivalent department in the United Kingdom
List of state departments of homeland security
National Biodefense Analysis and Countermeasures Center (NBACC), Ft Detrick, MD
National Interoperability Field Operations Guide
National Strategy for Homeland Security
Project Hostile Intent
Public Safety Canada, equivalent department in Canada
Shadow Wolves
Terrorism in the United States
United States visas

References

Further reading
 Bullock, Jane, George Haddow, and Damon P. Coppola. Introduction to homeland security: Principles of all-hazards risk management (Butterworth-Heinemann, 2011)
 Ramsay, James D.  et al. Theoretical Foundations of Homeland Security: Strategies, Operations, and Structures (Routledge, 2021)
 Sylves, Richard T. Disaster policy and politics: Emergency management and homeland security (CQ press, 2019).

Primary sources
 United States. Office of Homeland Security. National strategy for homeland security (DIANE Publishing, 2002) online.

.

External links

 
 Department of Homeland Security on USAspending.gov
 DHS in the Federal Register

 
2002 establishments in the United States
Disaster preparedness in the United States
Internal affairs ministries
Ministries established in 2002
Organizations based in Washington, D.C.
Public safety ministries
Organizations associated with Russian interference in the 2016 United States elections
United States federal executive departments
United States intelligence agencies